Franklin Park Medical Center is a historic building in Woodland Park, Columbus, Ohio. It was built in 1962 and listed on the National Register of Historic Places in 2016. It is significant for its Modernist architecture, one of few remaining commercial buildings in the style in Columbus, and has influences from Frank Lloyd Wright's Prairie School.

The building is also significant for its African American community history. The practice was founded by five doctors who were experiencing discrimination and segregation. Their combined efforts at Franklin Park Medical Center allowed them to be successful. The medical center operated until 2009. Columbus Landmarks supported an effort to nominate it to the National Register and restore it in 2015, led by a son of one of the five founding doctors.

See also
 National Register of Historic Places listings in Columbus, Ohio

References

External links

Commercial buildings completed in 1962
Commercial buildings on the National Register of Historic Places in Ohio
1962 establishments in Ohio
National Register of Historic Places in Columbus, Ohio
Endangered buildings in Columbus, Ohio
Woodland Park (Columbus, Ohio)
Modernist architecture in Ohio